Diving was contested from 7 to 10 December at the 1998 Asian Games in Thammasat University Aquatic Center, Bangkok, Thailand.

Medalists

Men

Women

Medal table

References

 
1998 Asian Games events
1998
Asian Games
1998 Asian Games